Rumphi is the capital of the Rumphi District (Rumphi Boma) in the Northern Region of Malawi.  It is a lively town with a market which serves the widespread farming community. Rumphi is noted for the kindness of the people (it is even rude to pass by someone without greeting them). It is directly on the way to Nyika National Park  Nyika Plateau and Vwaza Marsh Game Reserve.  Unlike its larger neighbour, Mzuzu, which has mild sunny weather almost all year, Rumphi has a differing climate. The town, being surrounded by hills, always has a nice wind. The town is bounded by the Rumphi river in the east and the South Rukuru River in the south.

Rumphi is famous for the cattle market. On every Saturday morning at 6:00 a.m. farmers and dealers are coming from far to sell and buy cattle. It is the biggest cattle market between Lilongwe, Karonga, and Mzimba. Along the road to Bolero, opposite the FDH Bank is Roscher Youth Development Centre and on its plot to the South Rukuru River the Support Malawi e.V. foundation initiated the first Earthbag House Lodge in Rumphi  built by the youth with walls of stacked sand bags. In addition an Earthbag Restaurant got attractive for visitors of the park-like area at the river as well as residents of the nice lodges.
Around Rumphi you find many tobacco fields as well as fields of maize, groundnuts, cassava, potatoes and much more.

Demographics

Gallery

References

Populated places in Northern Region, Malawi